Monégasque euro coins feature two separate designs for the first two series of coins, and also two separate designs for the €1 and €2 coins for the first series. All of the coins are inscribed with the word "Monaco" and the twelve stars of Europe. The Monégasque euro coins are minted by the Monnaie de Paris (Paris Mint).

Monégasque euro design
For images of the common side and a detailed description of the coins, see euro coins.

In Monaco the euro was introduced in 2002. However, the first sets of coins were minted, as preparation, in 2001. Hence the first euro coins of Monaco were minted with the year 2001 instead of 2002.

First series (2001–2005)

Second series (2006–present)
With the accession of Prince Albert II, new designs were warranted and these were issued in December 2006.

Circulating mintage quantities

€2 commemorative coins

See also

 Monégasque franc

Notes

References

External links

Euro coins by issuing country
Euro coins